N. nivea may refer to:
 Naja nivea, the Cape cobra or yellow cobra, a venomous snake species
 Neoregelia nivea, a plant species native to Brazil
 Notholaena nivea, a synonym for Argyrochosma nivea, an Andean fern species

See also 
 Nivea (disambiguation)